Roberto Vidal Bolaño (31 July 1950 – 11 September 2002) was a Galician playwright and actor. Galician Literature Day is dedicated to him in 2013.

Works
 Laudamuco, señor de Ningures (1976, Pico Sacro) .
 Bailadela da morte ditosa (1980, 1992, Sotelo Blanco) .
 Agasallo de sombras (1992, El Correo Gallego) .
 Cochos (1992, Sotelo Blanco) .
 Días sen gloria (1992, Deputación da Coruña) .
 Saxo tenor (1993, Xerais) .
 As actas escuras (1994).
 Touporroutou da lúa e do sol (farsada choqueira para actores e bonecos, ou viceversa) (1996, AS-PG) .
 Doentes (1998, Deputación da Coruña).
 A ópera de a patacón: versión libre para charanga e comediantes pouco ou nada subsidiados (1998, Xerais) .
 Rastros (1998, Positivas) .

References

1950 births
2002 deaths
People from Santiago de Compostela
Writers from Galicia (Spain)
Spanish male dramatists and playwrights
Male actors from Galicia (Spain)
Galician-language writers
20th-century Spanish dramatists and playwrights
20th-century Spanish male writers